"Just Coolin'" is a 1988 song collaboration between LeVert and Heavy D, written by Gerald Levert and Marc Gordon. The single peaked at number one on the Billboard Hot Black Singles chart, and was Heavy D's only number-one hit, and Levert's fourth number one on the chart.  "Just Coolin'" also peaked at number nineteen on the dance chart.

References

1988 songs
1989 singles
Atlantic Records singles
LeVert songs
Songs written by Gerald Levert